Belgrade City Administration ( / Uprava grada Beograda) was an administrative-security institution in Belgrade from 1839 to 1944. For most of that time, its headquarters was located in the notorious Glavnjača prison, on the present-day site of the University of Belgrade Faculty of Chemistry, on Students Square.

From the mid-19th century until the mid-20th century, Belgrade was governed by two levels of authority - Belgrade City Administration as holder of police and administrative state authority, and Belgrade City Municipality as holder of local self-government. In 1944, Belgrade City Administration was abolished after a different administrative organization was established in Belgrade.

Kingdom of Yugoslavia

When the Kingdom of Yugoslavia was divided into banovinas in 1929, a separate administrative-territorial unit called the Belgrade City Administration was formed, encompassing the City of Belgrade with surrounding area, including Zemun and Pančevo. This territory was entirely surrounded by Danube Banovina, which had administrative seat in Novi Sad. Following Axis invasion, occupation and partition of Yugoslavia in 1941, the Belgrade City Administration continued to exist as an administrative-territorial unit of the Territory of the Military Commander in Serbia until the end of 1941, when Serbia was divided into districts in a new territorial organization.

Administrators
Jovan German (13 July 1839 – 22 November 1839)
Ilija Čarapić (22 November 1839 – 27 May 1840)
Miloš Bogićević (27 May 1840 – 24 September 1840)
Mladen M. Žujović (24 September 1840 – 6 August 1842 and 1858)
Mihailo Ljotić (29 August 1842 – 22 September 1842)
Tenka Stefanović (22 September 1842 – 6 November 1842)
Radovan Damjanović (6 November 1842 – 20 December 1844)
Jovan Vučković (20 December 1844 – 22 July 1848)
Gavrilo Jeremić (22 July 1848 – 27 September 1852)
Konstantin Magazinović (27 September 1852 – 15 November 1855)
Milivoje Petrović Blaznavac (15 November 1855 – 18 October 1856)
Nikola Hristić (18 October 1856 – 11 February 1859 and 27 September 1859 – 7 October 1860)
Jovan Belimarković (30 November 1858 – 11 February 1859)
Jovan Dimitrijević Mitričević (11 February 1859 – 27 September 1859)
Dragutin Žabarac (27 September 1859 – 19 January 1861)
Mihailo Barlovac (19 January 1861 – 18 July 1868)
Jakov Tucaković (1 August 1868 – 4 April 1873 and 1 June 1876 – 1 June 1878)
Živojin Blaznavac (4 April 1873 – 13 February 1874 and 25 February 1879 – 17 March 1887)
Dimitrije Joksić (13 February 1874 – 22 October 1875 and 22 October 1875 – 1 June 1876 (acting))
Jovan Avakumović (22 October 1875 – 1 June 1876)
Janko Terzić (1877 – 4 February 1878)
Jakov Brzaković (4 February 1878 – 1 June 1878)
Pantelija Lunjevica (1 June 1878 – 25 February 1879)
Živko Anđelić (17 March 1887 – 6 June 1888)
Gliša Đorđević (6 June 1888 – 16 September 1889)
Vladimir Milenković (1889 and 1892)
Velimir Todorović (16 September 1889 – 13 January 1890)
Svetozar Arsenović (13 January 1890 – 11 May 1891)
Mihailo Jovanović (27 May 1891 – 1 August 1892)
Pavle Denić (1 August 1892 – 2 April 1893)
Stojan Protić (2 April 1893 – 7 April 1893)
Đorđe Nestorović (7 April 1893 – 12 January 1894)
Miloš Mihailović (12 January 1894 – 24 May 1894)
Živko Kasidolac (24 May 1894 – 29 October 1894)
Aleksa Stevanović (29 October 1894 – 1 August 1895)
Nikola Stevanović (1 August 1895 – 20 April 1896)
Rista Bademlić (20 April 1896 – 14 July 1900)
Božidar Maršićanin (13 July 1900 – 29 May 1903)
Bogdan Damjanović (29 May 1903 – 24 June 1903)
Dušan Vujić (24 June 1903 – 25 October 1903)
Mihailo Cerović (25 October 1903 – 20 January 1905 and 16 March 1906 – 19 July 1907)
Mihailo Rašković (20 January 1905 – 14 August 1905)
Dragić Pavlović (14 August 1905 – 21 January 1906)
Branimir Rajić (21 January 1906 – 15 March 1906)
Dragutin Milićević (19 September 1907 – 22 April 1908)
Obrad Blagojević (22 April 1908 – 27 September 1908)
Dušan Alimpić (22 September 1908 – 10 May 1910)
Gojko Pavlović (10 May 1910 – 4 September 1912)
Manojlo Lazarević (4 August 1912 – 9 September 1918 and 24 September 1919 – 27 December 1934)
Kosta Tucaković (9 September 1918 – 24 September 1919)
Dušan Filipović (27 December 1934 – 13 October 1935)
Milan Aćimović (13 October 1935 – 21 December 1938)
Živojin Simonović (9 February 1939 – 20 April 1939)
Dragoslav Lazić (1 March 1939 – 1 April 1940)
Dragomir Drinčić (28 March 1940 – 27 March 1941)
Milutin Stefanović (27 March 1941 – 1 April 1941)
Dušan Ribar (1 April 1941 – 12 April 1941)
Dragomir Jovanović (7 May 1941 – 5 October 1944)

See also
Mayor of Belgrade

Sources
Branislav Božović. Uprava i upravnici grada Beograda 1839-1944 - Prosveta 2011

Government of Belgrade
19th century in Belgrade
20th century in Belgrade
Law enforcement in Serbia